Jaydah Marie Bedoya Paiva (born 2002) is an Ecuadorian footballer who plays as a forward for American college team UConn Huskies and the Ecuador women's national team.

Early life
Bedoya was raised in New Bedford, Massachusetts, United States. Her father is Ecuadorian and her mother is Puerto Rican.

College career
Bedoya has attended the University of Connecticut in the United States.

International career
Bedoya made her senior debut for Ecuador on 22 February 2022.

References

External links

2002 births
Living people
People with acquired Ecuadorian citizenship
Ecuadorian women's footballers
Women's association football forwards
Ecuador women's international footballers
Ecuadorian people of Puerto Rican descent
Sportspeople from New Bedford, Massachusetts
Soccer players from Massachusetts
American women's soccer players
UConn Huskies women's soccer players
American people of Ecuadorian descent
Sportspeople of Ecuadorian descent
American sportspeople of Puerto Rican descent
21st-century Ecuadorian women